Laforrest H. Thompson (January 6, 1848 – June 22, 1900) was a Vermont attorney and politician who served as President of the Vermont State Senate and a Justice of the Vermont Supreme Court.

Biography
Laforrest Holman Thompson was born in Bakersfield, Vermont on January 6, 1848.  He was educated at Kimball Union Academy, taught school while studying law, was admitted to the bar in 1871, and opened a practice in Irasburg.

A Republican, Thompson served as Orleans County State's Attorney from 1874 to 1875, and county Judge of Probate from 1876 to 1881.

In 1880 and 1882 Thompson was Irasburg's member of the Vermont House of Representatives.  In 1884 Thompson was elected to the Vermont Senate.  He served one term, 1884 to 1885, and was the Senate's President Pro Tem.

In 1890 Thompson was again elected to the Vermont House of Representatives.  In 1891 he was appointed to the Vermont Supreme Court, on which he served until his death.

Thompson died in Irasburg on June 22, 1900.  He is buried in Irasburg Cemetery, Plot 350, Row U 32a.

Thompson's son Frank D. Thompson also served on the Vermont Supreme Court.  Frank Thompson was married to Mabel Miles, whose father Willard W. Miles was also an associate justice of the Vermont Supreme Court.

References 

1848 births
1900 deaths
People from Orleans County, Vermont
Republican Party members of the Vermont House of Representatives
Republican Party Vermont state senators
Presidents pro tempore of the Vermont Senate
Vermont lawyers
State's attorneys in Vermont
Vermont state court judges
Justices of the Vermont Supreme Court
Burials in Vermont
19th-century American politicians
19th-century American judges
19th-century American lawyers